Yahmureh or Yohmureh may refer to:
 Yahmureh 1
 Yahmureh 2
 Yahmureh 3